The 2004 Australian Formula Ford Championship was an Australian motor racing competition open to Formula Ford racing cars. The championship was managed by the Formula Ford Association Inc. and was promoted as the 2004 Ford Racing Australian Formula Ford Championship. It is recognised by the Confederation of Australian Motor Sport (CAMS) as the 12th Australian Formula Ford Championship.
 
The championship was won by David Reynolds driving a Van Diemen RF04.

Calendar
The championship was contested over an eight round series with three races per round.

Points system
Championship points were awarded on a 20-16-14-12-10-8-6-4-2-1 basis to the top ten finishers at each race. An additional point was awarded to the driver achieving pole position for the first race at each round.

Standings

All competing cars were required to comply with Formula Ford regulations as defined by CAMS. These regulations specified the mandatory use of a Ford 1600cc crossflow engine.

References

External links

Australian Formula Ford Championship seasons
Formula Ford